Ghana will be competing at the 2020 Summer Paralympics in Tokyo, Japan, from 24 August to 5 September 2021.

Athletics 

One Ghanaian male athlete, Botsyo Nkegbe (100m T54), successfully to break through the qualifications for the 2020 Paralympics after breaking the qualification limit.

Cycling 

Ghana sent one cyclist after successfully getting a slot in the 2018 UCI Nations Ranking Allocation quota for the African Continental.

Powerlifting 

Emmanuel Nii Tettey Oku represented Ghana and competed in the men's 72 kg event.

See also 
Ghana at the Paralympics
Ghana at the 2020 Summer Olympics

References 

2020
Nations at the 2020 Summer Paralympics
2021 in Ghanaian sport